Emma Perodi (31 January 1850, Cerreto Guidi - 5 March 1918, Palermo) was an Italian writer and journalist; best known for her children's books.

Biography 
For many years, it was uncertain if she had been born in Florence or Fiesole but, in the 1980s, a baptismal certificate was found that placed her birth in Cerreto Guidi. Her father, Federigo, was an engineer, and her mother, Adelaide Morelli Adimari had noble origins. She received an expensive education and was allowed the freedom to travel throughout much of Italy and Europe.

Her literary growth, however, took place mainly in Florence. From 1881, she was a collaborator and then, from 1887, director of the Children's Journal (Giornale per i bambini), which was published in Rome. Ferdinando Martini was its founder and first director.

Her best known work is Grandma's Stories, a collection of fantastic stories set in Casentino, published in installments between 1892 and 1893. Although designed for children, some of the stories contain Gothic elements that can be appreciated by adults.

A collection of her stories was published in English under the title Tuscan Tales: The Fantastic Fables of Emma Perodi, trans. Lori Hetherington (2020), .

She died from pneumonia in Palermo, where she had spent over twenty years working for the publishing firm of Salvatore Biondo.

In July, 2018, a park in Casentino was dedicated to her.

References

Further reading 
 Piero Scapecchi, Una donna tra le fate. Ricerche sulla vita e sulle opere di Emma Perodi, Edizioni della Biblioteca Rilliana, 1993
 La valle dei racconti. In Casentino con Emma Perodi, Paolo Ciampi and Alberta Piroci (Eds.), Aska Edizioni, 2019

External links 
 Biographies @ Treccani
 Works by Perodi @ the Open Library
 Il Principe della Marsiliana @ Project Gutenberg
 Il Medioevo contraffatto di Emma Perodi. L'ombra del Sire di Narbona, by Francesca Roversi Monaco, @  Storicamente

1850 births
1918 deaths
Italian children's writers
Italian women children's writers
Writers from Florence
19th-century Italian women writers
20th-century Italian women writers
Italian translators
19th-century translators
20th-century translators